Naillat is a commune in the Creuse department in the Nouvelle-Aquitaine region in central France.

Geography
A small tributary of the Creuse, the river Brézentine flows through the middle of the village.

Population

Sights
 The twelfth-century church, with a twisted spire.
 A feudal motte.
 Two menhirs.
 The château de La Vergne.

See also
Communes of the Creuse department

References

Communes of Creuse